Ghassan Waheed (Arabic:غسان وحيد) (born 7 March 1997) is a Qatari footballer. He currently plays as a midfielder for Muaither.

Career

Al-Sadd
Ghassan Waheed started his career at Al-Sadd and is a product of the Al-Sadd's youth system. On 31 January 2018, Ghassan Waheed made his professional debut for Al-Sadd against Al-Markhiya in the Pro League .

Al-Sailiya
On 1 July 2018 left Al-Sadd and signed with Al-Sailiya. On 11 August 2018, Ghassan Waheed made his professional debut for Al-Sailiya against Al-Gharafa in the Pro League . On 9 October 2018, he had an operation in the cruciate ligament .

Al-Markhiya
On 6 July 2019 left Al-Sailiya and return with Al-Markhiya.

External links

References

Living people
1997 births
Qatari footballers
Al Sadd SC players
Al-Sailiya SC players
Al-Markhiya SC players
Muaither SC players
Qatar Stars League players
Qatari Second Division players
Association football midfielders
Place of birth missing (living people)